Stacy Bennett is an American politician. She serves as a Democratic member for the 52nd district of the Illinois Senate.

Life and career 
Bennett is a member of the Democratic Party.

In 2022, Bennett was appointed by party leaders Mike Ingram and  Sandra Lawlyes to represent the 52nd district of the Illinois Senate, following the death of her husband Scott M. Bennett.

References 

Living people
Year of birth missing (living people)
Place of birth missing (living people)
Democratic Party Illinois state senators
21st-century American politicians
21st-century American women politicians